Curtis Dean Brown (born February 12, 1976) is a Canadian former professional ice hockey centre and defenceman. He was drafted by the Buffalo Sabres in the second round (43rd overall) of the 1994 NHL Entry Draft. Over his National Hockey League career, he played for the Buffalo Sabres, San Jose Sharks, and Chicago Blackhawks. Brown was born in Unity, Saskatchewan, but grew up in Senlac, Saskatchewan.

Brown currently serves as a Sharks Pregame and Postgame analyst on NBC Sports California.

Playing career
Brown was drafted in the second round of the 1994 NHL Entry Draft by the Buffalo Sabres. After finishing the 1994–95 WHL season with the Moose Jaw Warriors, he debuted with the Sabres on May 3, 1995 against the New Jersey Devils and scored a goal and an assist.

Brown returned to the WHL for 1995–96 and was traded from Moose Jaw to the Prince Albert Raiders before finishing out the season with Buffalo.

By 1997–98, Brown became a full-time player for the Sabres, usually on the third line.

In March 2004, Brown was traded to the San Jose Sharks in a three-way trade that saw Buffalo acquire Jeff Jillson from Boston while they received Brad Boyes and Andy Delmore. Brown played only 12 games for San Jose, however, and spent the 2004 NHL lockout season in the ECHL with the San Diego Gulls.

On July 2, 2004, Brown signed a four-year deal with the Chicago Blackhawks, only to be bought out after only one NHL season. Brown was the first player ever to have his contract bought out. 

Brown signed with San Jose as an unrestricted free agent in July 2006. The two-year deal was worth just $1.4 million, with Brown stating that he signed for such a relatively low salary because he had already received money from Chicago's buy-out.

On July 17, 2008, Brown completed his NHL career and signed with the Kloten Flyers of the Swiss Nationalliga A where he played for one season. He then switched to defense and played the final two seasons of his career with EHC Biel before retiring.

Personal life
Brown, of  Christian faith, has a wife, Ami. The couple had a daughter, Aubri who died in late 2005 of Sudden Infant Death Syndrome. The death of their daughter inspired them to create The Aubri Brown Foundation, a foundation that helps parents going through the loss of their children. They have three sons, Gage, Garrett, and Griffin.

Career statistics

Regular season and playoffs

International

Awards
 WHL East First All-Star Team – 1995
 WHL East Second All-Star Team – 1996

References

External links
 

1976 births
Buffalo Sabres draft picks
Buffalo Sabres players
Canadian ice hockey centres
Chicago Blackhawks players
EHC Biel players
Ice hockey people from Saskatchewan
EHC Kloten players
Living people
Moose Jaw Warriors players
People from Unity, Saskatchewan
Prince Albert Raiders players
Rochester Americans players
San Diego Gulls (ECHL) players
San Jose Sharks players
San Jose Sharks announcers
Canadian expatriate ice hockey players in the United States